Marilyn Dewarder (born 2 April 1960) is a Guyanese sprinter. She competed in the women's 400 metres at the 1988 Summer Olympics.

References

External links
 

1960 births
Living people
Athletes (track and field) at the 1988 Summer Olympics
Guyanese female sprinters
Olympic athletes of Guyana
Place of birth missing (living people)
Olympic female sprinters